Adugak Island (also spelled Adougakh, possibly from ; (Unangam Tunuu: Adugax̂) is a small island in the Fox Islands group in the Aleutian Islands of southwestern Alaska.

Name 
The name was recorded in 1840 by Ivan Veniaminov. It may arise from the word "Adudak", which means "somewhat long".

Geography 

Wildlife 
The island has been protected as a rookery for the endangered Steller sea lion, which has been observed during the winter feeding on the fish that inhabit the water nearby.

Cassin's auklet once lived in the area, but disappeared. They also disappeared from other Aleutian islands such as Keegaloo, and Ilak Island due to introduced predators, oil spills, and mortality from fisheries interactions.

Some animals on the island were tested positive for Polydnavirus, along with Yunaska.

References

Fox Islands (Alaska)
Islands of Aleutians West Census Area, Alaska
Islands of Alaska
Islands of Unorganized Borough, Alaska
Uninhabited islands of Alaska